The Broad Street Bully is the fifth studio album by rapper Beanie Sigel. It was released on September 1, 2009 without promotion, just a video for the song "The Ghetto". The album was on the Billboard 200 charts for 2 weeks. In the first week, it debuted at #77 selling 6,500 copies. The week after, it fell down to #115 selling an additional 4,000 copies.

Background
The album was released on Siccness.net (Siccness Records) and was the first time Sigel released an album on an independent label. The album was originally named The Focus but the title was then changed to The Broad Street Bully. The album had been described by the label to be "like a mixtape".

Track listing

References

2009 albums
Beanie Sigel albums